The Hap Holmes Memorial Award is an ice hockey trophy awarded annually to the goaltenders of the American Hockey League team with the lowest goals against average, and who have appeared in at least 25 regular season games.

Prior to 1972 awarded to the goaltender with the lowest goals-against average who appeared in at least 50% of regular season games. It was first awarded in 1948. The trophy is named after Hap Holmes.

Award winners

External links
Official AHL website
AHL Hall of Fame
Historic standings and statistics - at Internet Hockey Database

American Hockey League trophies and awards